Ralph C. Watts (born July 26, 1944) is the Iowa State Representative from the 19th District. A Republican, he has served in the Iowa House of Representatives since 2003. He received his BS from the University of Wyoming and did MBA work at Drake University and at Creighton University.

, Watts serves on several committees in the Iowa House – the Appropriations, Commerce, Labor, and State Government committees.  He also serves as the chair of the Administration and Regulation Appropriations Subcommittee.

Electoral history 
*incumbent

References

External links 

 Representative Ralph Watts official Iowa General Assembly site
 
 Financial information (state office) at the National Institute for Money in State Politics
 Profile at Iowa House Republicans

1944 births
Living people
People from Lovell, Wyoming
People from Adel, Iowa
American Latter Day Saints
Republican Party members of the Iowa House of Representatives
University of Wyoming alumni
Drake University alumni
Creighton University alumni
21st-century American politicians